Nam Yeong-sin (born 27 August 1990) is a South Korean handball player for BISCO and the South Korean Republic national team.
As member of the national team she competed at the 2016 Summer Olympics in Rio de Janeiro.

References

External links

1990 births
Living people
South Korean female handball players
Handball players at the 2016 Summer Olympics
Olympic handball players of South Korea
People from Changwon
Sportspeople from South Gyeongsang Province
21st-century South Korean women